The 2016 season for  began in January with the Tour Down Under. As a UCI WorldTeam, they were automatically invited and obligated to send a squad to every event in the UCI World Tour.

Team roster

Riders who joined the team for the 2015 season

Riders who left the team during or after the 2015 season

Season victories

National, Continental and World champions 2016

Footnotes

References

External links
 

2016 road cycling season by team
Saxo season
2016 in Russian sport